William Austin Moore (February 7, 1905 – March 28, 1972) was a pitcher in Major League Baseball. He pitched from 1929 to 1934 in the National League.

External links

1905 births
1972 deaths
Major League Baseball pitchers
Brooklyn Robins players
Brooklyn Dodgers players
Philadelphia Phillies players
Baseball players from Georgia (U.S. state)
Minor league baseball managers
Macon Peaches players
Jersey City Skeeters players
Baltimore Orioles (IL) players
Birmingham Barons players
Knoxville Smokies players
New Orleans Pelicans (baseball) players